Małgorzata Czajczyńska (born 19 July 1981 in Gorzów Wielkopolski) is a Polish sprint canoer who competed in the mid-2000s. She won two silver medals at the ICF Canoe Sprint World Championships (K-4 200 m: 2005, K-4 500 m: 2003).

Czajczyńska also finished fourth in the K-4 500 m event at the 2004 Summer Olympics in Athens.

References

Sports-reference.com profile

1981 births
Canoeists at the 2004 Summer Olympics
Living people
Olympic canoeists of Poland
Polish female canoeists
Sportspeople from Gorzów Wielkopolski
ICF Canoe Sprint World Championships medalists in kayak
21st-century Polish women